Terre Haute is an unincorporated community in Terre Haute Township, Henderson County, Illinois, United States.

References
 

Unincorporated communities in Henderson County, Illinois
Unincorporated communities in Illinois